Oklahoma Blues is a 1948 American Western film directed by Lambert Hillyer and written by Bennett Cohen. The film stars Jimmy Wakely, Dub Taylor, Virginia Belmont, I. Stanford Jolley, Zon Murray and George J. Lewis. The film was released on March 28, 1948, by Monogram Pictures.

Plot

Cast          
Jimmy Wakely as Jimmy Wakely
Dub Taylor as Cannonball Taylor
Virginia Belmont as Judy Joyce
I. Stanford Jolley as Beasley
Zon Murray as Matt Drago
George J. Lewis as Slip Drago 
Steve Clark as Sheriff Sam Oldring
Frank LaRue as Judge Emerson
J.C. Lytton as Walton 
Milburn Morante as Amos
Charles King as Gabe
Bob Woodward as Bob

References

External links
 

1948 films
American Western (genre) films
1948 Western (genre) films
Monogram Pictures films
Films directed by Lambert Hillyer
American black-and-white films
1940s English-language films
1940s American films